Olivia Lynne Lunny (born February 4, 1999) is a Canadian singer-songwriter and musician. Lunny was crowned a winner on CTV's singing competition The Launch and scored her first Top 40 hit.

Early life 
Olivia Lynne Lunny was born on February 4, 1999, in Winnipeg, Manitoba. She began playing guitar after her father initially gave her lessons at the age of 12. A year later, she began to write her own full songs.

Musical career

2018–2019: Debut eponymous EP and The Launch 
In 2018, Lunny independently released her debut eponymous EP, for which she was nominated for Pop Artist of the Year at the Western Canadian Music Awards. Early the following year, she was chosen as the winner of the second season of music-talent competition ‘The Launch’ leading to the release of her single "I Got You".

2020: To the Ones I Loved 
In April 2020, Lunny performed on a cover of ‘Lean on Me’ with fellow Canadian artists including Justin Bieber, Michael Bublé, and Avril Lavigne in support of the Canadian Red Cross during the COVID-19 pandemic.

Lunny co-wrote her second EP, To the Ones I Loved with AJ Healey over a 5 day studio session. The first single, ‘Think of Me’ was released April 17, 2020.

‘Bedsheets’ the second single from the project was released May 22, 2020, via a premiere with Parade and in September it was announced that Lunny had been selected as one of the five winners of the SOCAN Foundation Awards for Young Canadian Songwriter for the song. On October 27, 2020, the final video from the EP, ‘Bedsheets’ was premiered with Live Nation’s Ones To Watch.

The third single and accompanying video for ‘Hold Me’ were released July 24, 2020.

The full EP which included the final single, ‘Something New’ was premiered by PAPER on August 28, 2020.

In October 2020, Lunny signed an imprint deal for her label Infinity & with Universal Music Canada through Virgin Records globally.

2021-Present: Olivia Lunny Self Titled Debut Album 
In March 2021, Lunny was featured in Atwood Magazine’s International Women's History Month feature, where she discussed both her goals as a woman in the music industry and also hinted at new music coming later in the year. In the interview she explained her feelings on the importance of creating a collaborative and inclusive space in music for everyone, and the importance of diversity in the field. 

On April 9th, 2021 Lunny released the first single, “Sad to See You Happy”, from her upcoming album where it was featured as The Line of Best Fit’s Song of the Day where it received glowing praise. Co-written with AJ Healey, Shaun Frank, and Jenson Vaughn, Lunny told an Official Charts interview that the song came from the concept of “'love you to death' and being 'sad to see someone happy'. We loved the idea of playing off of an oxymoron." The music video for the track was directed by Louis Browne  and featured in Rolling Stone India upon its release.  

Later that spring, Lunny was featured as Notion’s Internet Crush.

The second single from the album, “Who Could Say No”, produced by Boi-1da and Yogi the Producer was released on May 28. (8) In an interview with ReVamp, Lunny explained that listening to disco music with her dad while growing up helped inspire the track.

Lunny’s debut full length album “Olivia Lunny” was released on July 9.  The album featured the third single, “Dominoes” which was co-written with Whitney Philips and Melanie Fontana, and produced by Tommy Brown and Mr. Franks. In an interview with Wonderland, Lunny explained the reason behind a self-titled debut was reflection of herself and the many sides of her artistry. In a feature with TMRW Magazine, Lunny expressed how she hoped the album would become part of the soundtrack to listener’s life experiences.

Discography 
 Olivia Lunny (2018) 
 To the Ones I Loved (2020)
Olivia Lunny (2021)

References 

1999 births
Living people
Canadian women pop singers
21st-century Canadian women singers